In geometry, the Gosset–Elte figures, named by Coxeter after Thorold Gosset and E. L. Elte, are a group of uniform polytopes which are not regular, generated by a Wythoff construction with mirrors all related by order-2 and order-3 dihedral angles. They can be seen as one-end-ringed Coxeter–Dynkin diagrams.

The Coxeter symbol for these figures has the form ki,j, where each letter represents a length of order-3 branches on a Coxeter–Dynkin diagram with a single ring on the end node of a k length sequence of branches. The vertex figure of ki,j is (k − 1)i,j, and each of its facets are represented by subtracting one from one of the nonzero subscripts, i.e. ki − 1,j and ki,j − 1.

Rectified simplices are included in the list as limiting cases with k=0. Similarly 0i,j,k represents a bifurcated graph with a central node ringed.

History

Coxeter named these figures as ki,j (or kij)  in shorthand and gave credit of their discovery to Gosset and Elte:
 Thorold Gosset first published a list of regular and semi-regular figures in space of n dimensions in 1900, enumerating polytopes with one or more types of regular polytope faces. This included the rectified 5-cell 021 in 4-space, demipenteract 121 in 5-space, 221 in 6-space, 321 in 7-space, 421 in 8-space, and 521 infinite tessellation in 8-space.
 E. L. Elte independently enumerated a different semiregular list in his 1912 book, The Semiregular Polytopes of the Hyperspaces. He called them semiregular polytopes of the first kind, limiting his search to one or two types of regular or semiregular k-faces.

Elte's enumeration included all the kij polytopes except for the 142 which has 3 types of 6-faces.

The set of figures extend into honeycombs of (2,2,2), (3,3,1), and (5,4,1) families in 6,7,8 dimensional Euclidean spaces respectively. Gosset's list included the 521 honeycomb as the only semiregular one in his definition.

Definition 

The polytopes and honeycombs in this family can be seen within ADE classification.

A finite polytope kij exists if

or equal for Euclidean honeycombs, and less for hyperbolic honeycombs.

The Coxeter group [3i,j,k] can generate up to 3 unique uniform Gosset–Elte figures with Coxeter–Dynkin diagrams with one end node ringed. By Coxeter's notation, each figure is represented by kij to mean the end-node on the k-length sequence is ringed.

The simplex family can be seen as a limiting case with k=0, and all rectified (single-ring) Coxeter–Dynkin diagrams.

A-family [3n] (rectified simplices) 

The family of n-simplices contain Gosset–Elte figures of the form 0ij as all rectified forms of the n-simplex (i + j = n − 1).

They are listed below, along with their Coxeter–Dynkin diagram, with each dimensional family drawn as a graphic orthogonal projection in the plane of the Petrie polygon of the regular simplex.

D-family [3n−3,1,1] demihypercube

Each Dn group has two Gosset–Elte figures, the n-demihypercube as 1k1, and an alternated form of the n-orthoplex, k11, constructed with alternating simplex facets. Rectified n-demihypercubes, a lower symmetry form of a birectified n-cube, can also be represented as 0k11.

En family [3n−4,2,1] 

Each En group from 4 to 8 has two or three Gosset–Elte figures, represented by one of the end-nodes ringed:k21, 1k2, 2k1. A rectified 1k2 series can also be represented as 0k21.

Euclidean and hyperbolic honeycombs 

There are three Euclidean (affine) Coxeter groups in dimensions 6, 7, and 8:

There are three hyperbolic (paracompact) Coxeter groups in dimensions 7, 8, and 9:

As a generalization more order-3 branches can also be expressed in this symbol. The 4-dimensional affine Coxeter group, [31,1,1,1], has four order-3 branches, and can express one honeycomb, 1111, represents a lower symmetry form of the 16-cell honeycomb, and 01111,  for the rectified 16-cell honeycomb. The 5-dimensional hyperbolic Coxeter group, [31,1,1,1,1], has five order-3 branches, and can express one honeycomb, 11111,  and its rectification as 011111, .

Notes

References
 
   
 Coxeter, H.S.M. (3rd edition, 1973) Regular Polytopes, Dover edition, 
 Norman Johnson Uniform Polytopes, Manuscript (1991)
 N.W. Johnson: The Theory of Uniform Polytopes and Honeycombs, Ph.D. Dissertation, University of Toronto, 1966

Polytopes